The Iranian Parliament Committee on Energy, or Energy Committee is a standing committee of the Islamic Consultative Assembly of Representatives. The Parliament Committee on Energy has general Oil, gas, electricity, water and electric dams and power plants, nuclear power and renewable energy and it can recommend funding appropriations for various governmental agencies, programs, and activities, as defined by House rules. in the 11th parliament; Fereidon Hasanvand was president, Qasem Saedi first deputy and Ahmad Moradi second deputy.

See also 
 Specialized Commissions of the Parliament of Iran
 Joint Commission of the Islamic Consultative Assembly
 Special Commission of the Islamic Consultative Assembly
 The history of the parliament in Iran
 Internal Regulation Commission of the Islamic Consultative Assembly

References

Committees of the Iranian Parliament
Energy in Iran
Energy organizations